Kallankurichi is a village in the Ariyalur taluk of Ariyalur district, Tamil Nadu, India.

Demographics 
Sri Kaliyaperumal temple is a major attraction of Kallankurichi. It is situated at 5 km away from Ariyalur. This temple is famous for its "Car festival" (March/April) which is conducted yearly. The people of Kallankurichi and Ariyalur District celebrate the festival grandly.
The temple is also famous for the Puraittasi Saturdays. Every year in the month of 'Puraittasi' (September), special Pujas, 'Arathanai', 'Abishekams', etc. are done on the four Saturdays. This also is a major attraction of the Kaliyaperumal temple.

G. Govindasamy Padayachi is the Hereditary Trustee of the Temple.'

 census, Kallankurichi had a total population of 4884 with 2452 males and 2432 females.

References 

Villages in Ariyalur district